Trevor Nurse (14 February 1965 – 25 July 2016) was a British professional darts player.

Darts career
Nurse played in the 1989 BDO World Darts Championship, losing in the first round to Sweden's Magnus Caris. He returned to the Lakeside in 1994, but again lost in the first round, this time to fellow Scot Ronnie Sharp, who went on to reach the semi-finals.

World Championship Results

BDO
 1989: 1st Round (lost to Magnus Caris 1–3)
 1994: 1st Round (lost to Ronnie Sharp 2–3)

References

External links
Profile and stats on Darts Database

British Darts Organisation players
Scottish darts players
1965 births
2016 deaths